Antonio Torres Millera (20 August 1964 – 5 January 2019) was a Spanish politician and a member of the People's Party of Aragon. He served as a deputy of the Aragonese Corts, the regional parliament, from 2003 until his death in 2019. He was also second Vice President of the Aragonese Corts at the time of his death in 2019.

Torres died in office from a heart attack on 5 January 2019, at the age of 54. He was survived by his wife and two daughters.

References

1964 births
2019 deaths
Members of the Cortes of Aragon
People's Party (Spain) politicians
People from Huesca